The 2013–14 Handball-Bundesliga was the 49th season of the Handball-Bundesliga, Germany's premier handball league, and the 37th season consisting of only one league.

Team information

Standings

Results

Number of teams by states

External links
Official website 

Handball-Bundesliga
2013–14 domestic handball leagues
2013 in German sport
2014 in German sport